Rudolf Schnackenburg (5 January 1914 – 28 August 2002) was a German Catholic priest and New Testament scholar. Joseph Ratzinger referred to him as "probably the most significant German-speaking Catholic exegete of the second half of the twentieth century."

Life 
Schnackenburg spent his childhood in Liegnitz and finished secondary school there (at the "Gymnasium Johanneum") in 1932. He then studied philosophy and theology at the universities of Breslau and Munich. In 1937 he earned his doctoral degree from the University of Breslau for a dissertation written under Friedrich Wilhelm Maier on "faith" in the Gospel of John. In the same year, he was ordained a priest by CardinalAdolf Bertram and began pastoral work in Silesia until he was expelled from there in 1946, after World War II. He then earned his Habilitation (Dr. habil.) in New Testament Exegesis in 1947 with the work "Das Heilsgeschehen bei der Taufe nach dem Apostel Paulus" ("The Salvation through Baptism according to the Apostle Paul"). His Habilitation was also completed under Friedrich Wilhelm Maier, now at the Ludwig Maximilian University of Munich, and Schnackenburg was then made Privatdozent there in 1948. From 1952 he was Lecturer in New Testament Exegesis at the Philosophisch-Theologischen Hochschule Dillingen. In 1955, Schnackenburg was made full professor in Bamberg. From 1957 until 1982, he was Professor of New Testament at the University of Würzburg. After his retirement, he provided pastoral care in a retirement home and also worked with the Community of Sant'Egidio.

Work 
Schnackenburg was a member of the International Theological Commission (ITC), wrote numerous books (including a commentary on the Gospel of John) and worked on the translation of the German Einheitsübersetzung of the Bible.

Select Publications 
Commentaries
 Das Evangelium nach Markus, 2 vols. (Düsseldorf)
 Das Matthäusevangelium, 2 vols. (Die Neue Echter Bibel; Würzburg)
 Das Johannesevangelium, 4 vols. (Herders theologischer Kommentar zum Neuen Testament 4; Freiburg)
 Der Brief an die Epheser (Evangelisch-Katholischer Kommentar zum Neuen Testament 10; Düsseldorf)

Other Publications
 Die sittliche Botschaft des Neuen Testaments (Herders theologischer Kommentar zum Neuen Testament, Supplementband 2; Freiburg 1986–1988), vol. 1: Von Jesus zur Urkirche, vol. 2: Die urchristlichen Verkündiger
 Der Jesusweg: Meditationen zum lukanischen 'Reisebericht''' (Stuttgarter Taschenbücher 4; Stuttgart 1990)
 Gott hat seinen Sohn gesandt: Das Weihnachtsgeheimnis (Freiburg 1990)
 Die Person Jesu Christi im Spiegel der vier Evangelien, new edition (Herders theologischer Kommentar zum Neuen Testament, Supplementband 4; Freiburg 1998)
 Freundschaft mit Jesus (Freiburg 1995)
 Predigt in der Gemeinschaft Sant’Egidio (Würzburg 2003)
 Die Bergpredigt: Utopische Vision oder Handlungsanweisung? (Düsseldorf 1984)

Festschriften
 Joachim Gnilka, ed., Neues Testament und Kirche: [Festschrift] für Rudolf Schnackenburg [zum 60. Geburtstag am 5. Januar 1974 von Freunden und Kollegen gewidmet] (Freiburg 1974)
 Helmut Merklein, ed., Neues Testament und Ethik: [Festgabe] für Rudolf Schnackenburg'' (Freiburg 1989)

References

External links
 Homily eulogizing Rudolf Schnackenburg

1914 births
2002 deaths
People from Katowice
People from the Province of Silesia
20th-century German Catholic theologians
German biblical scholars
Roman Catholic biblical scholars
New Testament scholars
University of Breslau alumni
Ludwig Maximilian University of Munich alumni
Academic staff of the Ludwig Maximilian University of Munich
Academic staff of the University of Würzburg
Commanders Crosses of the Order of Merit of the Federal Republic of Germany
People from Legnica
German male non-fiction writers
20th-century German Roman Catholic priests